Lake Oconee is a reservoir in central Georgia, United States, on the Oconee River near Greensboro and Eatonton. It was created in 1979 when Georgia Power completed the construction of the Wallace Dam on the Oconee River.

Lake Oconee runs through Georgia's Morgan, Greene, and Putnam counties and is separated from its sister lake, Sinclair, by Wallace Dam.

Oconee is the name of an ancient Creek town.

Hydrology
Lake Oconee serves as a reservoir for Georgia Power Company's Wallace Hydroelectric Plant. The lake has 374 miles of shoreline with a surface area of 19,971 acres.  It is formed by the Oconee River and Apalachee River (Georgia)

Housing

Lake Oconee is home to a number of golf communities, including Reynolds Lake Oconee, Cuscowilla, and Harbor Club. There are also senior living communities including Del Webb at Lake Oconee.

References

External links
 Georgia Power- Lake Oconee

Protected areas of Greene County, Georgia
Protected areas of Hancock County, Georgia
Protected areas of Morgan County, Georgia
Protected areas of Putnam County, Georgia
Oconee
Dams in Georgia (U.S. state)
Georgia Power dams
Bodies of water of Greene County, Georgia
Bodies of water of Hancock County, Georgia
Bodies of water of Morgan County, Georgia
Bodies of water of Putnam County, Georgia